The K Is Silent is the debut studio album of the American country music band Hot Country Knights. The band is led by Dierks Bentley (under his alter-ego) and is a parody of country music, specifically 1990s-era country. It was released on May 1, 2020 via Capitol Records Nashville.

Content
The album includes the lead single "Pick Her Up", a duet with Travis Tritt. Dierks Bentley, who performs on the album in-character as Douglas "Doug" Douglasson, produced the album.

Critical reception
Giving it 4.5 out of 5 stars, Stephen Thomas Erlewine called it "a parody album that can also hold its own with the songs it sends up" and "This blend of brains, brawn, and bawdiness all sounds invigorating when delivered by this band of bozos".

Track listing

Personnel
Adapted from The K Is Silent liner notes.
Musicians
Brett Beavers - background vocals
Jim Beavers - acoustic guitar, background vocals
Terri Clark - duet vocals on "You Make It Hard"
Douglas "Doug" Douglason - vocals, whistling
Terotej "Terry" Dvoraczekynski - fiddle, keytar, background vocals
Monte Montgomery - drums, percussion, background vocals
Billy Nobel - keyboards
Marty Ray "Rayro" Roburn - acoustic guitar, electric guitar, background vocals, whistling
Trevor Travis - vocals, bass guitar, whistling
Travis Tritt - duet vocals on "Pick Her Up"
Barry Van Ricky - pedal steel guitar
Luke Wooten - background vocals
Technical
Brett Beavers - production assistant
Jim Beavers - production assistant
Dierks Bentley - producer
Scott Johnson - production coordinator
Jon Randall - production assistant
Ryan Smith - mastering
Austin Stanley - recording assistant
Luke Wooten - recording, mixing

References

2020 albums
Capitol Records Nashville albums
Dierks Bentley albums